The 1902 A&M Aggies football team represented the Agricultural and Mechanical College of Texas—now known as Texas A&M University—as an independent during the 1902 college football season. Led by first-year head coach J. E. Platt, the Aggies compiled a record of 7–0–2.

Schedule

References

Texas AandM
Texas A&M Aggies football seasons
College football undefeated seasons
Texas AandM Aggies football